Peep and the Big Wide World (PATBWW) is an animated children's television series created by Danish-Canadian animator Kaj Pindal. It revolves around the lives of Peep, Chirp, and Quack, as viewers discover, investigate, and explore the world around them.

The show was based on the 1988 short film of the same name produced by the National Film Board of Canada, which itself is based on the 1962 short film The Peep Show, also produced by the National Film Board of Canada. The series premiered on April 12, 2004, on Discovery Kids and on TLC as part of their Ready Set Learn children's block, and on the same day on TVOKids and PBS Kids. It was produced by WGBH Boston (through its kids division WGBH Kids) and 9 Story Media Group (formerly 9 Story Entertainment), in association with TVOntario and Discovery Kids and is distributed by Alliance Atlantis (through AAC Kids).

Carriage on the Discovery children's networks ended on October 10, 2010 with the discontinuation of Ready Set Learn and the replacement of Discovery Kids with The Hub, and now, Discovery Family. Since 2004, it continues to be offered to public television stations via independent public television distributor American Public Television to the present day. Since January 1, 2018, the series (alongside Pocoyo, which is seen after the program) is distributed by both PBS Kids and APT. Throughout its run, it has been underwritten by the National Science Foundation, with Northrop Grumman underwriting season four in 2010.

Each episode consists of two 9-minute stories, which are animated segments, and two 2-minute live action segments, in which children explore and demonstrate the same topic presented in the animated segment. the show is narrated by well-known actress Joan Cusack.

Overview 
Viewers follow Peep, Chirp, and Quack as they investigate and explore the world around them. Following the 9-minute animated episode, there is a 2-minute live-action segment which features children exploring and demonstrating the same topic presented in the episode. The animation consists of bright colors and simple shapes, which simulates and reflects a youthful art style.

Episodes

Season 1 (2004)

Season 2 (2005-2006)

Season 3 (2007)

Season 4 (2010)

Season 5 (2011)

Characters

Main
 Peep (Voiced by Scott Beaudin in the first 3 seasons, Shawn Molko in Season 4 and Maxwell Uretsky in Season 5): A male, yellow chicken who is very curious. He is the youngest bird of the group. The show's title is derived from his name. Peep is female in the original short film.
 Chirp (Voiced by Amanda Soha): A female, red robin who is also curious, and attempts frequently to fly, with unsatisfying results, until "A Daring Duck", when she flies from the ground. In "Big Bird" she meets a real robin for the first time. She is Peep and Quack's friend. Chirp is male in the original short film.
 Quack (Voiced by Jamie Watson): A male, blue-purple duckling who wears a white sailor's hat. He is older than Peep and Chirp, as they are still chicks. He frequently boasts about himself and ducks as a whole, and unwittingly makes many discoveries. Quack is purple in the original short film and is now referred to as blue, but is still quite indigo. He also seems to have a hoarding issue, as evidenced in the episode "An Inconvenient Tooth, Part 1."
 The Narrator (Voiced by Joan Cusack): The Narrator tells the episode's story, although the characters rarely have any interaction with her. In the episodes "Dry Duck, Part 1" the birds did have a short interaction with her and in "Quack Quiets the Universe" she and Quack interact as well.

Minor
 Ant (Voiced by Robert Tinkler): A busy male ant who appears in some episodes.
 Beaver Boy (Voiced by Tessa Marshall): A young naïve male beaver who lives in an adjoining pond to Quack's. He appears in several episodes. His desire to please his mom and dad often results in him chewing down too many trees. He often calls Quack "Blue Sailor" Peep "Yellow Guy" and Chirp "Red Round".
 Beaver Mom: (Voiced by Debra McGrath) Beaver Boy's workaholic mother.
 Beaver Dad (Voiced by Phillip Williams):  Beaver Boy's businesslike father.
 Dragonfly (Voiced by Catherine Disher): A quiet dragonfly.
 Fish: Cohabitants of Quack's pond.
 Frog: A frog who lives in Quack’s pond. He rarely talks.
 Hoot (Voiced by Corinne Conley): A menacing, but kind purple female owl who lives in the Deep Dark Woods.
 Nellie (Voiced by Marium Carvell): A red female dog who acts as a seemingly maternal figure for the birds.
 Newton (Voiced by Colin Fox): An old, male, dark-green turtle who lives under an apple tree.
 Quack #2 (Voiced by Megan Mullally): An annoying pink female duck who has her own pond, built by Quack, Peep, Chirp, Beaver Boy and his parents.
 Rabbit (Voiced by Jayne Eastwood): An excitable and somewhat distracted rabbit.
 Robin (Voiced by Holly Hunter): An adult robin.
 Skunk (Voiced by Adrian Truss): A rather deadpan skunk who lives near Quack's pond.
 Bat (Voiced by Ron Rubin): A shy bat.
 Squeak (Voiced by Kathleen Laskey): An anxious pink, female mouse who lives under a brick and always worries about what could go wrong.
 Tom (Voiced by Alex Hood and Matthew Knight): A sly, male blue & black kitten who often tries to eat Peep, Chirp, and Quack. He is the sole antagonist.
 Raccoon (Voiced by Jeff Lumby): A gobbo, male brown & black raccoon who often tries to wear his sun glasses in "A Peep of a Different Color"
 Blue Jays (Voiced by David Hudson): Silly blue and white birds who love to cause trouble when they see stuff.

Music composition
Music for Peep and the Big Wide World is composed by Terry Tompkins and Steve D'Angelo, from Eggplant. The opening theme is performed by Taj Mahal.

Broadcast

United States
Peep and the Big Wide World was originally broadcast on TLC and Discovery Kids — the latter as part of the Ready Set Learn preschool block —, from April 12, 2004 to September 14, 2007, with reruns of the first three seasons continuing to air until October 8, 2010 when Discovery Kids discontinued the block to make way for the new network to launch known as The Hub on October 10. The last two seasons were broadcast on PBS Kids with episodes distributed exclusively by APT from January 4, 2010 to October 14, 2011, making the total of 60 episodes (120 segments), while also airing on a limited number of PBS stations first-run, with the rest of the selected PBS stations airing the seasons second-run from the rest of 2010 and 2011 respectively. During the existence of Ready Set Learn, the series was also acquired to selected PBS member stations with only episodes from season one. After the discontinuation of Ready Set Learn preschool block, PBS stations started to pick up the remaining episodes from seasons two and three by early 2011.

On January 1, 2018, Peep and the Big Wide World was picked up on the 24-hour PBS Kids channel, marking the first time to air the series for PBS member stations, which never acquired the series since its original run in 2004. The broadcast of the series ended on December 26, 2021, when it was replaced with reruns of Dinosaur Train to the 7:30 a.m. weekend morning timeslot.

Media

Home video
WGBH Boston Video released the episodes of the first season on DVD and VHS in 2005. The 2005 DVD releases each contained six segments of the specified subject; Peep Explores, Peep Finds, Peep Floats, Peep's New Friends, Chirp Flies, and Quack Knows It All. The 2007 DVD release, Peep Figures It Out contained six segments as usual, plus two bonus segments. In 2011, PBS Kids Video released two DVDs; Seasons of Adventure, and Star Light, Star Bright, which contains episodes from seasons two and three respectively. In 2012, PBS Kids Video released two more DVDs; Finders Keepers and Bringing Spring. In 2014, PBS Kids Video released two more DVDs; Diva Duck, and Peep Discovers (which was once available as a limited release to retail stores). As of 2020, all of these DVDs are now out of print and very hard to find, but commonly found at public libraries. In Canada, Entertainment One released three DVDs in both English and French languages; Stick With Me, Peep's Moon Mission, and Flower Shower.

References

External links

WGBH
9 Story Entertainment
National Science Foundation grant information
Watch the original Peep and the Big Wide World at NFB.ca
Read Goodman Research Group's executive summary of the Peep website evaluation
Watch some of the harder to find episodes of Peep and the Big Wide World on Emmaton Entertainment®.
Watch the ONLY remaining copy of I Spy A Spider here

2004 American television series debuts
2011 American television series endings
2000s American animated television series
2010s American animated television series
2004 Canadian television series debuts
2011 Canadian television series endings
2000s Canadian animated television series
2010s Canadian animated television series
2000s preschool education television series
2010s preschool education television series
American children's animated adventure television series
American children's animated comedy television series
American children's animated fantasy television series
American preschool education television series
American flash animated television series
American television series revived after cancellation
American television series with live action and animation
Animated preschool education television series
Canadian children's animated adventure television series
Canadian children's animated comedy television series
Canadian children's animated fantasy television series
Canadian flash animated television series
Canadian preschool education television series
Canadian television series revived after cancellation
Canadian television series with live action and animation
Daytime Emmy Award for Outstanding Animated Program winners
Discovery Kids original programming
English-language television shows
PBS Kids shows
PBS original programming
Television series by 9 Story Media Group
Television series by WGBH
Animated television series about birds
Television series about chickens
Animated television series about ducks
TVO original programming